Reign in Hell is a 1997 novel by William Diehl.

Plot
Martin Vail, now a United States Attorney, is assigned a case in which he must go up against a survivalist militia — and unexpectedly encounters his nemesis, Aaron Stampler, seemingly back from the dead and posing as a blind Baptist preacher.

References

1997 American novels
Legal thriller novels
American thriller novels
Sequel novels
English-language novels